Aurora Township may refer to:

 Aurora Township, Kane County, Illinois
 Aurora Township, Cloud County, Kansas 
 Aurora Township, Minnesota
 Aurora Township, Benson County, North Dakota
 Aurora, Ohio, formerly Aurora Township, Portage County, Ohio

Township name disambiguation pages